Castelnaud-de-Gratecambe is a commune in the Lot-et-Garonne department in the Occitanie region of Southwestern France.

See also
Communes of the Lot-et-Garonne department

References

Castelnauddegratecambe